The 2019–20 BPL season, also known as BPL 7 or Bangabandhu BPL Presented by Akash DTH and Powered by TVS (for sponsorship reasons), was the seventh season of the Bangladesh Premier League (BPL), the top level professional Twenty20 cricket league in Bangladesh. The competition was organised by the Bangladesh Cricket Board (BCB). The season was scheduled to originally start from 6 December 2019 and end on 11 January 2020, with the opening ceremony to be held on 3 December 2019. Comilla Victorians were the defending champions. However, the tournament was delayed by five days and started on 11 December 2019 and ended on 17 January 2020, with the opening ceremony held on 8 December 2019.

Chittagong Vikings were announced as not taking part in this edition of the tournament after their ownership was sold, and were replaced by two new teams. A total of eight teams were originally scheduled to participate in this edition of the tournament, with contracts of pre-signed cricketers being cancelled until the players' draft. However, the idea was cancelled, with the number of teams being reverted to seven, and Chittagong Vikings being renamed to Chattogram Challengers and reinstated after the change of format by the BCB.

In the final match, Rajshahi Royals defeated Khulna Tigers by 21 runs to win their first ever BPL title. Rajshahi Royals captain Andre Russell won both Player of the match and Player of the Tournament award for his all-round performances. Rilee Rossouw was the leading run scorer in the tournament with 495 runs while the leading wicket-taker were tied with four players with 20 wickets.

Changes of rules
On 11 September 2019, BCB president Nazmul Hasan Papon informed the media about certain changes in rules and regulations for the ongoing season during a press briefing. Due to having some conflict of interests between BPL Governing Council and all other franchises, the BCB decided to run this edition of the BPL themselves without taking any franchises. The Board wanted to mark the occasion of the 100th birth anniversary of Bangabandhu in 2020 and to pay homage to him, the tournament was named Bangabandhu BPL after him. The teams names were same as they were and only the responsibility to manage the team was on the BCB. The players’ transportation and accommodation was managed by the board. On 13 November 2019, the sponsorship and names of Chittagong, Dhaka, Khulna, Rajshahi and Sylhet teams were confirmed. The Comilla and Rangpur teams were sponsored by BCB themselves.

Draft and squads

The players' draft was scheduled to be held on 12 November 2019. However, the tournament was delayed by five days and the draft was held on 17 November 2019. Out of 7 teams, 5 teams are sponsored by private corporate firms while 2 teams are sponsored by BCB itself.

On 16 November 2019, BPL Governing Council unveiled the logo for this season and the names of the participating 7 teams. The squads were confirmed during the draft.

Venues

Results

Points table

 
  advanced to the Qualifier 1
  advanced to the Eliminator

League progression

League stage

A total of 42 matches will played in the league stage, with 24 matches played in Dhaka, 6 matches in Sylhet and 12 in Chittagong.

Phase 1 (Dhaka)

Phase 2 (Chittagong)

Phase 3 (Dhaka)

Phase 4 (Sylhet)

Phase 5 (Dhaka)

Playoffs

Eliminator

Qualifiers
Qualifier 1

Qualifier 2

Final

Statistics

Most runs

Most wickets

Highest team totals

See also
 Mujib 100 T20 Cup Bangladesh 2020

Notes

References

External links
 Series home at ESPNCricinfo

 
Bangladesh Premier League seasons
2019 in Bangladeshi cricket
Bangladesh Premier League